Reuven Michael Carlyle (born August 10, 1965) is an entrepreneur and American politician who served as a Democratic member of the Washington legislature representing the Washington's 36th legislative district in the state house between 2009 and 2016 and in the state senate between 2016 and 2023. The district spans the Seattle neighborhoods of South Lake Union, Belltown, Queen Anne, Magnolia, Greenwood, Ballard, Crown Hill, Blue Ridge. It is home of the Space Needle in the Seattle Center, the Bill & Melinda Gates Foundation and PATH as well as global companies including Amazon, Expedia and more.

Professionally, Carlyle is a technology entrepreneur and sustainability and climate consultant. He has served in business development, public policy, sales, marketing, corporate development, board of director and/or strategic consulting roles with a number of early- and mid-stage technology companies including McCaw Cellular Communications (Acquired by AT&T Wireless Services), Xypoint Corp. (Acquired by TCS, Inc.), Twisted Pair Solutions (Acquired by Motorola) and others. He continues to provide sustainability, business development and strategic consulting services to leading companies and organizations.

Legislature
Carlyle serves as chair of the Senate Environment, Energy & Technology Committee, as well as a member of the Ways & Means and Rules Committee. Carlyle was re-elected in 2018 for a four-year term with 89.3% of the vote against Libertarian Bryan Simonson.

Carlyle announced that he is not seeking re-election in 2022. The Seattle Times lauded Carlyle's public service.

During Carlyle's years as committee chair, the Legislature has adopted among the most sweeping carbon legislation in the U.S. This includes: Climate Commitment Act (the second cap and invest carbon pricing legislation in anticipation of joining the Western Climate Initiative); Clean Fuel Standard; HEAL Act (environmental justice and equity), transportation package widely considered the greenest package in state history; commercial building standards; building efficiency standards, HFCs and more. Under the legislation, Washington is one of the few governments in the world with, in effect, binding and enforceable commitments to Paris Accord and the policy framework to achieve the reductions.

In 2019, Carlyle successfully prime sponsored comprehensive clean energy legislation, SB 5116, to require all electric utilities in Washington to transition to a 100-percent, carbon-neutral electricity supply by 2030 and to 100-percent carbon-free electricity by 2045. The bill was a cornerstone of Gov. Jay Inslee's climate agenda.

In 2018, he was one of only seven senators to vote against the Legislature's public records bill that was ultimately vetoed by Gov. Jay Inslee following a public outcry by the state's media and the public.

Carlyle's legislative priorities have been centered around budget policy and tax transparency, foster youth, higher education, energy and environmental priorities. In 2007, prior to his election, Carlyle authored the Passport to College Promise Program which was ultimately created by the Legislature.

Carlyle was first elected to the Washington House of Representatives in 2008, representing the 36th legislative district as a Democrat.  He was appointed to the state Senate in 2016 to succeed veteran Sen. Jeanne Kohl-Welles who was elected in 2015 to the King County Council.

During Carlyle's seven years in the House he focused on a range of policy areas including budget, tax, higher education, transportation, health care, open data and election issues. He sponsored major legislation to reform higher education finance and improve the educational success of foster youth.  Carlyle has been the prime sponsor of legislation in each year to abolish the death penalty and replace the policy with life in prison without the possibility of parole.  Carlyle has been a critic of efforts to expand coal and oil trains and exports throughout the Pacific Northwest.  He has been a vocal legal and political opponent of initiative promoter Tim Eyman's efforts to alter the state constitution to require a supermajority to raise taxes.

In 2013 Carlyle was appointed chair of the House Finance Committee and as a budget writer. During his three years as Finance chair, Carlyle sponsored legislation to provide transparency into Washington's tax structure.  He also passed major legislation to reinstate Washington's estate tax as well reform the state's telecommunications taxation. In the Finance role, he was a prime sponsor and a supporter of the accountability and transparency provisions of the Boeing tax package, widely considered the largest state tax incentive package in U.S. history.  Carlyle was publicly critical of the abbreviated process of the special session.

Carlyle was named in 2012 as "one of 12 legislators in the nation to watch" by Governing Magazine.  He was named one of the most "tech savvy" legislators in the nation by GovTech.  He was named by the progressive organization Fuse as a champion of tax reform.  In 2016 he was awarded the Ballard/Thompson Award by the Washington State Coalition for Open Government, the state's premier organization for open government and public access to government information. In 2017, he received legislator of the year award from Washington Conservation Voters.

Carlyle announced he would not seek reelection on January 24, 2022.

Personal

Carlyle resides in Seattle with his wife Dr. Wendy Carlyle an anesthesiologist practicing at Swedish Medical Center in Ballard. They have four school-age children:  Adi, Liat, Zev and Nava.
Carlyle grew up in Bellingham, Washington and developed his interest in government while serving as a teenage page in Congress.  He served as a page for two years in the U.S. Senate for Senators Warren Magnuson and Henry "Scoop" Jackson, and one year in the House of Representatives where he served briefly as personal page to Speaker Thomas P. "Tip" O'Neill, Jr.  
Carlyle's mother, Joan Hadiyah Carlyle, self-published her autobiography "A Torch in the Dark, one woman's journey."

Prior to his election, Carlyle was appointed by Governor Chris Gregoire in 2004 as a member of the Washington State Board for Community and Technical Colleges.  He crafted legislation in 2007 as a citizen activist for foster youth, Passport to College Promise, a scholarship program.  Carlyle was a citizen co-founder of the Seattle/King County Chapter of City Year, a national AmeriCorps program.

Education
Carlyle received a bachelor's degree from the University of Massachusetts Amherst and a MPA from the John F. Kennedy School of Government at Harvard University.

References

External links
Washington State Legislature - Sen. Reuven Carlyle Official Washington State Senate site
Official Reuven Carlyle Blog

Democratic Party members of the Washington House of Representatives
Democratic Party Washington (state) state senators
1965 births
Living people
Politicians from San Francisco
Harvard Kennedy School alumni
University of Massachusetts Amherst alumni
21st-century American politicians